This is a list of football stadiums in Sweden, ranked in descending order of capacity.

There are many football stadiums and pitches in Sweden, so this list is not comprehensive. It includes:

 All 64 clubs in the top three tiers of the Swedish football league system as of the 2021 season (Allsvenskan, Superettan, Division 1 Norra and Division 1 Södra).
 All stadiums, with a capacity of at least 4,000, of clubs playing in lower tiers of the league system.

Existing stadiums

Other stadiums

Stadiums under construction

References

See also
List of stadiums in the Nordic countries by capacity
List of European stadiums by capacity
List of association football stadiums by capacity
List of indoor arenas in Sweden
Record home attendances of Swedish football clubs

 
Sweden
stadiums
Football